In sociology, the upper middle class of the United States is the social group constituted by higher-status members of the middle class in American society. This is in contrast to the term lower middle class, which refers to the group at the opposite end of the middle class scale. There is considerable debate as to how the upper middle class might be defined. According to Max Weber, the upper middle class consists of well-educated professionals with graduate degrees and comfortable incomes.

The American upper middle class is defined using income, education, occupation and the associated values as main indicators. In the United States, the upper middle class is defined as consisting of white-collar professionals who have above-average personal incomes, advanced educational degrees and a high degree of autonomy in their work, leading to higher job satisfaction. The main occupational tasks of upper middle class individuals tend to center on conceptualizing, consulting, and instruction.

Professions
Certain professions can be categorized as "upper middle class," though any such measurement must be considered subjective because of people's differing perception of class. Most people in the upper-middle class strata are highly educated white collar professionals such as physicians, dentists, lawyers, accountants, engineers, military officers, economists, urban planners, university professors, architects, stockbrokers, psychologists, scientists, actuaries, optometrists, physical therapists, pharmacists, veterinarians, high-level civil servants and the intelligentsia. Other common professions include corporate executives and CEOs, and successful business owners. Generally, people in these professions have an advanced post-secondary education and a comfortable standard of living.

Values
Education is probably the most important part of middle-class childrearing as they prepare their children to be successful in school. Upper middle-class parents expect their children to attend college.  Along with hard work, these parents view educational performance and attainment as necessary components of financial success.  Consequently, the majority of upper middle-class children assume they will attend college.  For these children, college is not optional—it's essential. This thought can be seen even more so from parents with higher education, whose greater appreciation for autonomy leads them to want the same for their children. Most people encompassing this station in life have a high regard for higher education, particularly towards Ivy League colleges and other top tier schools throughout the United States. They probably, more than any other socio-economic class, strive for themselves and their children to obtain graduate or at least four-year undergraduate degrees, further reflecting the importance placed on education by middle-class families.

Members of the upper middle class tend to place a high value on high culture and foreign travel. This is in line with the emphasis placed on education, as foreign travel increases one's understanding of other cultures and helps create a global perspective.

Most mass affluent households and college-educated professionals tend to be center-right or conservative on fiscal issues, but moderate to liberal on social issues.  Prior to 1992, these professionals heavily favored the Republican Party, but began slowly drifting toward the Democratic Party due to the increasing rightward shift of Republican leadership on social and cultural issues such as abortion, gay rights, race, and immigration. By 2003, a slight majority of college-educated professionals, who compose 15% of the population and 20% of the electorate, favored Democrats. Among those with six figure household incomes,  a slight majority favored the Republican Party in 1998. Per exit polls conducted by the television network CNN following the 2004 and 2006 U.S. elections, academia and those with postgraduate degrees (e.g., to include PhD and J.D.) especially favor the Democratic Party.

In 2005, 72% of full-time faculty members at four-year institutions, the majority of whom are upper middle class, identified as liberal.

The upper middle class is often the dominant group to shape society and bring social movements to the forefront. Movements such as the Peace Movement, the anti-nuclear Movement, the civil rights movement, feminism, LGBT rights, environmentalism, the anti-smoking movement, and even in the past with the 1960s counterculture, Blue laws and the Temperance movement have been in large part, although not solely, products of the upper middle class. Some claim this is because this is the largest class (and the lowest class) with any true political power for positive change, while others claim some of the more restrictive social movements (such as with smoking and drinking) are based upon "saving people from themselves."

American upper middle class
See American Professional/Managerial middle class for a complete overview of the American middle classes.

 
In the United States the term middle class and its subdivisions are an extremely vague concept as neither economists nor sociologists have precisely defined the term. There are several perceptions of the upper middle class and what the term means. In academic models the term applies to highly educated salaried professionals whose work is largely self-directed. Many have graduate degrees with educational attainment serving as the main distinguishing feature of this class. Household incomes commonly exceed $100,000, with some smaller one-income earners household having incomes in the high 5-figure range.

In addition to having autonomy in their work, above-average incomes, and advanced educations, the upper middle class also tends to be influential, setting trends and largely shaping public opinion. Overall, members of this class are also secure from economic down-turns and, unlike their counterparts in the statistical middle class, do not need to fear downsizing, corporate cost-cutting, or outsourcing—an economic benefit largely attributable to their graduate degrees and comfortable incomes, likely in the top income quintile or top third. Typical professions for this class include psychologists, professors, accountants, architects, urban planners, engineers, economists, pharmacists, executive assistants, physicians, optometrists, dentists, and lawyers.

Income

While many Americans see income as the prime determinant of class, occupational status, educational attainment, and value systems are equally important. Income is in part determined by the scarcity of certain skill sets. As a result, an occupation that requires a scarce skill, the attainment of which is often achieved through an educational degree, and entrusts its occupant with a high degree of influence will usually offer high economic compensation. There are also differences between household and individual income. In 2005, 42% of US households (76% among the top quintile) had two or more income earners; as a result, 18% of households but only 5% of individuals had six figure incomes. To illustrate, two nurses each making $55,000 per year can out-earn, in a household sense, a single attorney who makes a median of $95,000 annually.

Sociologists Dennis Gilbert, Willam Thompson and Joseph Hickey estimate the upper middle class to constitute roughly 15% of the population. Using the 15% figure one may conclude that the American upper middle class consists, strictly in an income sense, of professionals with personal incomes in excess of $62,500, who commonly reside in households with six figure incomes. The difference between personal and household income can be explained by considering that 76% of households with incomes exceeding $90,000 (the top 20%) had two or more income earners.

SOURCE: US Census Bureau, 2006

See also
 Bourgeoisie
 Middle class
 Social class

US-specific
 Affluence in the United States
 American middle class
 American upper class
 Educational attainment in the United States
 Household income in the United States
 Millionaire
 Personal income in the United States
 Social class in the United States

Further reading

References

External links
 America's Disappearing Middle Class: Implications for Public Policy and Politics by Trevor Beltz, May 2012
 Definition of Middle Class stratification
 Relationship between income and education

American middle class
Social class in the United States
Upper middle class